Paul Poulton is a British singer-songwriter, guitarist and writer. Born in West Bromwich, West Midlands, England, he has released fifteen albums, eight singles and four books since 1989. That year Paul did over a hundred performances in his first year on the road as a Singer/Songwriter. He tours in the UK and US, appearing at a variety of venues. His song "Flaky People" was played extensively by Mid-West American radio station WQRP in the late 1990s. The song talked about flaky leaders who fool around, which became poignant at the time of the Bill Clinton – Monica Lewinsky scandal.

Poulton performs as a solo performer with an acoustic guitar and also with his band the Paul Poulton Project. He is noted as a skilled guitarist. He talks between songs about life, human idiosyncrasies, faith, God and philosophy. He is known as an apologist for Christianity in which his discourses are liberally seasoned with humour.

A CrossRhythms Magazine review of "Fallen People on a Fallen Planet" said: "Paul’s great strength is that he crafts songs that say more in a stanza than most songsmiths can manage in an album".

Music critic Peter Dilley wrote for Christian Music magazine, saying:
 ". . . a skilled lyricist. . .he examines human waywardness – offering hope . . . after exploding secular values with devastating effect. " 
Phantom Tollbooth said:  " It’s like Dante and Bunyan in guitar-funk form. ".

A sample of Poulton's music may be found on Spotify and other music sites - "Paul Poulton" or "Paul Poulton Project".

A book written by Poulton called Genesis for Ordinary People was published in November 2014. The book is subtitled "Unwrapping the First Book of the Bible" and follows the storyline of Genesis from the viewpoint of a modern person who is interested in the subject. Reviewer Robin Thompson writing in Never For Nothing said, "Paul... using a mix of apologetics, hermeneutics and a knack for communicating complex ideas in an accessible way, manages to cut through some of the misinformation and, dare I say, misinterpretation, the latter of which has not been confined to secular circles." A web site has been set up where Poulton has answered a few questions raised by the book. A follow-up book entitled "Exodus for Ordinary People" has been published in August 2016. The American publishers Wipf and Stock are publishers of all Poulton's books including the 2018 book "God and Primordial People" and "Fishing for Praise" published in 2008

Poulton has written for a number of sites and magazines including Cross Rhythms, the online edition of The Baptist Times, British Runner magazine and HeartBeat The Magazine

Since 2020 Paul has been creating content for Living Stones - Church on the internet - a facebook group and YouTube channel

Discography

Albums 
 I Think I'm Being Followed (1989 Big Feet Music/Temporary Music)
 Fallen People on a Fallen Planet (1990 Chapel Lane)
 Fallen People on a Fallen Planet (1992 Word Records)
 Fallen People on a Fallen Planet (Euro Mix) (1993 Chapel Lane)
 Body And Soul (1995 Chapel Lane)
 Soothing Saul (1996 Chapel Lane)
 Little Boy EP (1998 Chapel Lane)
 Flaky (1998 Temporary Music)
 Angel (2001 Temporary Music)
 Affected (2005 Temporary Music)
 Grooves 4 Scrooge (2008 Temporary Music)
 Dumb Dogs (2008 Temporary Music)
 Looking For Someone To Blame (2009 Temporary Music)
 Too Twitchy (2010 Temporary Music)
 Some People Believe Anything (2011 Temporary Music)
 Words (2013 Temporary Music)
 Heaven (2018 Temporary Music)

Singles 
 "Too Many Things To Worry About" (2008 Temporary Music)
 "Wade in the Water" (2012 Temporary Music)
 "Get in the Spirit" (2012 Temporary Music)
 "Revelator (The Apostle John)"(2014 Temporary Music)
 "Stronger" (2014 Temporary Music)
 "Mistakes I've Made (Acoustic)" (2015 Temporary Music)
 "Distracted" (2016 Temporary Music)
 "Worker" (2018 Temporary Music)

Books 
 "Fishing for Praise" (2008 Wipf and Stock)
 "Genesis for Ordinary People" (2014 Wipf and Stock)
 "Exodus for Ordinary People" (2016 Wipf and Stock)
 "Genesis for Ordinary People - Second Edition" (2017 Wipf and Stock)
 "God and Primordial People" (2018 Wipf and Stock)

References

External links 
 
 "Genesis for Ordinary People website"
 "Too Many Things To Worry About" with Joe Blanks
 "Wade In The Water" Paul Poulton Project§

Living people
English male singers
English rock singers
English rock guitarists
English male guitarists
English blues guitarists
Christian apologists
People from West Bromwich
1956 births